Louis Shoobridge may refer to:

Louis Shoobridge Sr. (1851–1939), Australian politician
Louis Shoobridge Jr. (1920–2005), Australian politician, his grandson